Cheomseongdae (Hanja:) is an astronomical observatory in Gyeongju, South Korea. Cheomseongdae is the oldest surviving astronomical observatory in Asia, and possibly even the world. It was constructed in the 7th century in the kingdom of Silla, whose capital was Seorabeol, or present-day Gyeongju. Cheomseongdae was designated as the country's 31st national treasure on December 20, 1962. Modeled on Baekje's Jeomseongdae, which now exists only in historical records, the Cheomseongdae influenced the construction of the Japanese  observatory in 675, and Duke Zhou's observatory in China in 723.

Structure

Cheomseongdae stands 9.17 meters high and consists of three parts: a stylobate, or base upon which a column is constructed, a curved cylindrical body, and a square top. Midway up the body stands a square window and entrance to the inside of the structure. When viewed from above, Cheomseongdae resembles the Korean Hanja character , meaning "well."

The square stylobate base is 5.7 meters wide and built from a single layer of 12 rectangular stones. From the base to the window, the tower is filled with earth and rubble.

The cylindrical body of the tower is built out of 365 pieces of cut granite, symbolizing the number of days in a year. However, various historical documents have reported different numbers of stones. Song (1983) cites a 1962 survey of the site by Gyeongju National Museum director Hong Sa-jun, who found 366 blocks. This discrepancy in stone count may be attributed to some researchers including or omitting a stone slab inside the top of the tower and not visible from the outside. The stones are fashioned as annular sectors, meaning each stone takes the shape of a curved or bent rectangle.

Its construction style parallels that used at the Bunhwangsa Temple in Gyeongju.

Symbolism

The number and placement of the stones in Cheomseongdae have been theorized to represent various historical and astronomical figures.

The central hole or window separates the body into 12 layers of stones both above and below, symbolizing the 12 months in a year and the 24 solar terms. Additionally, the 12 stones which comprise the stylobate may also reference the 12 months.

Preservation
Cheomseongdae's original appearance and shape has remained unchanged for over 1300 years; however the structure now tilts slightly to the north-east. In 2007, a system was installed to measure the state of Cheomseongdae every hour. Of particular concern are cracks and structural displacements, and movements of the foundation stones. Cheomseongdae is additionally susceptible to wear due to aging and weathering, particularly from air pollution and structural imbalance caused by ground subsidence. The exterior of the structure is regularly washed down to remove moss.

The National Research Institute of Cultural Heritage in Korea has conducted inspections on the structure regularly since 1981. The Gyeongju municipal government oversees the site's management and preservation.

Popular culture
Cheomseongdae is mentioned in the popular Korean drama Queen Seondeok. In the 2009 drama, Cheomseongdae was constructed when Queen Seondeok was still a princess; this was her first decree as a princess. Cheomseongdae was meant to share the knowledge of astronomy with everyone, rather than letting one person (Lady Misil) abuse the knowledge of it. By doing so, she also abdicated her divine rights. Because this was uncommon at the time and unsupported by many conservatives, at the opening of Cheomseongdae, barely any nobles showed up.

References

Further reading

Jeon, Sang-woon.  (1998). A history of science in Korea.  Seoul:Jimoondang.  
 Nha, Il-seong. Silla's Cheomseongdae. (2001) Korea Journal 41(4), 269-281 (2001)
 Song, Sang-Yong. A brief history of the study of the Ch'ŏmsŏng-dae in Kyongju; Korea Journal 23(8), 16-21 (1983)

External links

UNESCO Portal to the Heritage of Astronomy - Cheomseongdae
Asian Historical Architecture: Cheomseongdae
Travel in Korea Cheomsongdae information page

Buildings and structures completed in the 7th century
Towers
National Treasures of South Korea
Astronomical observatories in South Korea
Science and technology in Korea
Silla
Buildings and structures in North Gyeongsang Province